Daniel Hadley Sumner (September 15, 1837 – May 29, 1903) was a U.S. Representative from Wisconsin.

Born in Malone, New York, Sumner moved to Michigan in 1843 with his parents, who settled in Richland, Michigan.
He attended the common schools, and Prairie Seminary, in Richland.
He studied law.
He was then admitted to the bar in 1868, and commenced practice in Kalamazoo, Michigan.
He moved to Oconomowoc, Wisconsin in 1868 and practiced law.
He also published the La Belle Mirror.
He moved to Waukesha, Wisconsin in 1870, and continued the practicing law. He also became the town's superintendent of schools.
He served as a member of the county board of supervisors.
He served as district attorney of Waukesha County in 1876 and 1877.

Sumner was elected as a Democrat to the Forty-eighth Congress (March 4, 1883 – March 3, 1885). He represented Wisconsin's 2nd congressional district.
He was not a candidate for renomination in 1884.
Afterwards he resumed the practice of law.
He died in Waukesha, Wisconsin on May 29, 1903.
He was interred in Prairie Home Cemetery.

References

External links

 

1837 births
1903 deaths
County supervisors in Wisconsin
Editors of Wisconsin newspapers
People from Richland, Michigan
People from Malone, New York
People from Oconomowoc, Wisconsin
Politicians from Waukesha, Wisconsin
Michigan lawyers
Wisconsin lawyers
Democratic Party members of the United States House of Representatives from Wisconsin
19th-century American politicians